Blabicentrus hirsutulus is a species of beetle in the family Cerambycidae. It was described by Bates in 1866. It is known to inhabit Brazil and French Guiana.

References

Desmiphorini
Beetles described in 1866